Fayetteville Municipal Airport  is a public use airport located six nautical miles (7 mi, 11 km) south of the central business district of Fayetteville, a city in Lincoln County, Tennessee, United States, in the community of Park City. It is owned by the Fayetteville-Lincoln Airport Authority. It is included in the National Plan of Integrated Airport Systems for 2011–2015, which categorized it as a general aviation airport.

Facilities and aircraft 
Fayetteville Municipal Airport covers an area of 113 acres (46 ha) at an elevation of 984 feet (300 m) above mean sea level. It has one runway designated 2/20 with an asphalt surface measuring 5,900 by 100 feet (1,798 x 30 m).

For the 12-month period ending June 3, 2009, the airport had 14,444 aircraft operations, an average of 39 per day: 97% general aviation, 2% air taxi, and 1% military. At that time there were 25 aircraft based at this airport: 72% single-engine, 24% multi-engine, and 4% jet.

References

External links 
 FayettevilleMunicipalAirport.com
 Aerial image as of March 1997 from USGS The National Map
 
 

Airports in Tennessee
Buildings and structures in Lincoln County, Tennessee
Transportation in Lincoln County, Tennessee